Oudheusden is a village in the Dutch province of North Brabant.

The name Oudheusden literally means "Old-Heusden", from the Dutch "oud" (English: old) and is used to distinguish from Heusden. Oudheusden was first mentioned in between 1108 and 1121 as Hysdene.

Oudheusden was home to 858 people in 1840. Oudheusden was a separate municipality until 1935, when it became part of Heusden. After World War II, Heusden wanted to expand and demolish its fortification, however the Dutch Monument organisation prevented their demise. It has resulted in an extension of the city into the village.

References

Populated places in North Brabant
Former municipalities of North Brabant
Heusden